Plica semilunaris can refer to:
 Plica semilunaris of conjunctiva
 Plica semilunaris of the fauces
 Plicae semilunares of the colon